The  Washington Redskins season was the franchise's 76th season in the National Football League. The Redskins finished their regular season with a record of 9–7 and a playoff appearance. This was an improvement over the 2006 season when they went 5–11 and finished last in the NFC East.

Over the course of the season, Washington went 5–3 in home games at FedExField, and 4–4 on the road; they lost 6 of their 7 games by one touchdown or less. After losing to the Seattle Seahawks in the wild card round, Coach Joe Gibbs announced his retirement, thus ending his second stint as head coach of the Redskins. During the season, the tragedy of Sean Taylor's death occurred before a game against the Buffalo Bills. For the first defensive play, they fielded 10 men leaving the usual free safety spot empty to honor Taylor.

Coaching staff
Head coach Joe Gibbs entered his fourth year of his second tenure with the Redskins and was the second-to-last year on his existing contract. Gibbs previously coached the Redskins in the 1981–1992 seasons, during which he had won three Super Bowls with the Redskins. On January 8, 2008, three days after the season ended, Gibbs announced his retirement from the position of head coach and president; he remained on board as a special assistant to Dan Snyder.

The Redskins fired former linebackers coach Dale Lindsey and promoted Kirk Olivadotti to take his job. Olivadotti previously helped coach the defensive line and special teams. The Redskins also added Tony Spinosa, Matthew Shea, and Bill Khayat to their coaching staff.

Offseason

Signings
On March 2, the Redskins signed London Fletcher, formerly with the Buffalo Bills, to a 5-year, $25 million contract. The deal also includes a $10.5 million signing bonus.
On March 3, the Redskins signed Fred Smoot, formerly with the Minnesota Vikings, to a 5-year deal. Smoot was drafted by the Redskins in 2001 and signed with the Vikings in 2005.
On March 8, the Redskins signed Ross Tucker, formerly with the Cleveland Browns, to an undisclosed contract.
On March 21, the Redskins signed Jason Fabini, formerly with the Dallas Cowboys, to an undisclosed contract.
On April 5, the Redskins signed David Macklin, formerly with the Arizona Cardinals, to a 1-year contract.
 On June 1, the Redskins signed Jason McAddley, formerly with the San Francisco 49ers, to an undisclosed contract.
 On August 21, the Redskins signed Randall Godfrey, formerly with the San Diego Chargers, to an undisclosed contract.

Departures
On February 22, the Redskins released safety Troy Vincent.
On February 28, the Redskins released tight end Christian Fauria.
On March 2, Derrick Dockery signed with the Buffalo Bills.
On March 4, Kenny Wright signed with the Cleveland Browns.
On March 7, the Redskins released kicker John Hall.
On March 9, T. J. Duckett agreed to terms with the Detroit Lions.
On March 20, Adam Archuleta was traded to the Chicago Bears in exchange for a conditional 6th round draft pick.
On March 22, the Redskins released wide receiver David Patten.
 On April 26, Warrick Holdman signed with the Denver Broncos.
 On August 21, the Redskins released linebacker Lemar Marshall.
 On September 1, the Redskins released cornerback Ade Jimoh and Defensive end Renaldo Wynn.

Free agents heading into the 2007 season

2007 NFL Draft

Roster

Preseason

Schedule

Week 1: at Tennessee Titans

The Redskins started their first preseason against the Tennessee Titans on the road on August 11. The Redskins defense allowed only six points and caused four fumbles, one of which they recovered. Many were surprised to see the Redskins' Quarterback Jason Campbell play the whole 1st half. Campbell wasn't productive, fumbled twice, and didn't score any touchdowns. The Redskins scored two late touchdowns in the last 1:17 to win the game. Marcus Mason scored a 1-yard rushing touchdown, and Byron Westbrook recovered a fumble in the endzone.GameBook

Week 2: vs. Pittsburgh Steelers

In the Redskins' second preseason game, they scored first but not without having a scare first. On their second drive, Quarterbacks Jason Campbell was tackled at the knee while throwing a complete 29-yard pass to tight end Chris Cooley—Campbell hobbled off the field with a bruised knee. Todd Collins took over for Campbell with some early success in the game; he threw a 7-yard touchdown pass to Brandon Lloyd. The Redskins had four goal-line stands, and only allowed 12 points (four field goals). However, their offense struggled to really got back into the swing of things without Campbell; their only other score of the game was a field goal. The Redskins' sustained some injuries during the game: linebacker Marcus Washington suffered a dislocated elbow, and wide receiver Mike Espy ruptured his tendon and subsequently was out for the season due to the injury. GameBook

Week 3: vs. Baltimore Ravens

Due to severe thunderstorms, the Redskins' third preseason game was shortened at the 11:38 mark in the third quarter. The kickoff was delayed over an hour and the game started at 9:12. The Redskins scored first in the game. Shaun Suisham had two field goals. The Redskins' defense looked great the whole night, only allowing the Ravens to a touchdown. In the third quarter, linebacker Dallas Sartz intercepted a Kyle Boller pass and ran it back for a touchdown. The game ended shortly thereafter. GameBook

Week 4: at Jacksonville Jaguars

The Redskins started their last preseason game strong. The defense forced a 3-and-out on Jacksonville's first drive and the Redskins scored on their first possession. Jason Campbell finished the game with 5 of 5 completions and a touchdown to Antwaan Randle El. Mark Brunell also threw a touchdown pass to Ryan Hoag. Though the Redskins were leading at halftime, they did not score again for the rest of the game. They eventually gave up three more touchdowns as the Jaguars rallied past the Redskins' backups. GameBook

Regular season

Schedule

Standings

Week 1: vs. Miami Dolphins

The Redskins scored the first points of the game when Shaun Suisham kicked a 31-yard field goal in the second quarter. On the last play of the 1st half, Trent Green threw a 1-yard pass to Justin Peelle to claim the lead. The Redskins started the third quarter with Clinton Portis running for a 19-yard touchdown. Miami later answered with a field goal to tie the game. In the 4th quarter, both teams scored a field goal and the game went into overtime. Washington won the coin toss. They ran the ball down to Miami's 22-yard line, and Shaun Suisham made a game-winning 39-yard field goal. Clinton Portis finished the game with 17 carries, 98 yards, and a touchdown. The Redskins lost right tackle Jon Jansen for the year when he fractured his ankle in the second quarter. GameBook

Week 2: at Philadelphia Eagles

The Redskins' second regular season game, against the Philadelphia Eagles, started off with a Redskins field goal at the end of the first quarter. Less than five minutes into the second quarter, the Eagles scored a field goal to tie the game at 3-3. A few minutes later, the Eagles scored another field goal to take the lead 6-3, the only lead the Eagles produced for the entire game. Just before halftime, Jason Campbell hit Chris Cooley for a touchdown to end the first half up 10-6.

In the third quarter, the Eagles and Redskins both scored another field goal, bringing the score to 13–9 prior to a Redskins drive that began with 1:15 remaining in the third quarter. That eventually led to Clinton Portis running for a six-yard touchdown early in the 4th quarter, bringing the score to 20-9.

The Eagles, with a field goal late in the 4th quarter, were down by 8 as they drove down to the Redskins 9-yard line. The Eagles' drive stalled and they turned the ball over on downs with an incomplete pass. With possession on their own 9-yard line, the Redskins ran out the clock on their way to a victory. The final score was 20-12.

Week 3: vs. New York Giants

In the first quarter, the Redskins trailed early as The New York Giants kicker Lawrence Tynes got a 34-yard field goal. The Redskins took the lead with running back Clinton Portis getting a 1-yard touchdown run. In the second quarter, quarter back Jason Campbell completed an 8-yard touchdown pass to tight end Chris Cooley, while kicker Shaun Suisham made a 47-yard field goal. In the third quarter, Giants running back Reuben Droughns made a 1-yard touchdown run for the only score that quarter. In the fourth quarter, the Giants took the lead with Droughns getting another 1-yard touchdown run, while quarter back Eli Manning completed a 33-yard touchdown pass to wide receiver Plaxico Burress. The Redskins managed to get a late-game drive, but it ended up with running back Ladell Betts getting taken down at the Giant's 1-yard line on 4th & Goal.

With the loss, the Redskins fell to 2–1 entering their bye week.

Week 5: vs. Detroit Lions

Coming off their bye week, the Redskins stayed at home for a Week 5 duel with the Detroit Lions. The Lions at that time had never beaten the Redskins in Washington, D.C. Though the first quarter was scoreless, the Redskins began a 14-play 80-yard drive that finished with a 7-yard touchdown pass from Jason Campbell to Chris Cooley. The Redskins' next possession began at their own 17-yard line: in summary, an 83-yard drive in 7 plays, culminating in a touchdown for Mike Sellers in a 1-yard rushing play. The first half ended with the Redskins up, 14–0. With 2:27 left in the third quarter, the Lions scored their first and only points with a 39-yard field goal to bring the score to 14–3. The Redskins' next drive was only 9 yards and resulted in a  punt, but put the Lions on their own 8-yard line. After a rushing play that resulted in a loss of 1 yard, the Redskins sacked Lions' quarterback Jon Kitna in the end zone for a safety, increasing the Redskins' lead to 13 with a score of 16–3 to end the third quarter. After a fourth-quarter fumble by Redskins' running back Clinton Portis, the Lions took possession at their own 10-yard line. The Lions drove 26 yards before punting to James Thrash, who returned the punt for 62 yards and fumbled towards the end zone, where Rock Cartwright recovered the ball on the 3-yard line. After a Redskins' five-yard penalty, Redskins quarterback Jason Campbell threw an 8-yard touchdown pass to Mike Sellers and then converted a two-point attempt with a pass to Chris Cooley bringing the score to 24–3. Detroit's next possession ended with an interception by safety Sean Taylor for a 35-yard return which later helped the Redskins finish a drive with a field goal. With less than 3 minutes in the fourth quarter, the Lions began a drive at their own 43-yard line. After gaining 14 yards, Jon Kitna threw an interception to cornerback Carlos Rogers, who returned it 61 yards for a touchdown for the final score of the game.

With the win, the Redskins improved to 3–1.

Week 6: at Green Bay Packers

Coming off their dominating home win over the Lions, the Redskins flew to Lambeau Field for a Week 6 inter-conference duel with the Green Bay Packers. In the first quarter, Washington trailed early as Packers running back DeShawn Wynn managed to get a 3-yard touchdown run. The Redskins responded with quarterback Jason Campbell getting a 6-yard touchdown run. In the second quarter, the Redskins took the lead as Campbell completed a 14-yard touchdown pass to tight end Chris Cooley for the only score in the quarter.

In the third quarter, Washington struggled as Packers' kicker Mason Crosby got a 37-yard field goal, while cornerback Charles Woodson returned a fumble 57 yards for a touchdown. Afterwards, in the fourth quarter, the Packers held on for the win.

With the loss, the Redskins fell to 3–2.

Week 7: vs. Arizona Cardinals

Trying to rebound from their road loss to the Packers, the Redskins went home for a Week 7 match-up against the Arizona Cardinals. In the first quarter, Washington took the early lead with running back Clinton Portis getting a 2-yard touchdown run for the only score of the quarter. In the second quarter, the Redskins increased its lead with linebacker London Fletcher returning an interception 27 yards for a touchdown. The Cardinals scored as quarterback Kurt Warner completed a 2-yard touchdown pass to wide receiver Anquan Boldin (with a failed PAT).

In the third quarter, Washington increased its lead with Portis getting a 1-yard touchdown run for the only score of the quarter. In the fourth quarter, the Cardinals managed to get within striking distance as quarterback Warner and wide receiver Boldin hooked up on a 10-yard touchdown pass. Afterwards, the Cardinals got within two points with quarterback Tim Rattay completing a 1-yard touchdown pass to tight end Leonard Pope (with a failed 2-point conversion). Later, the Cardinals managed to recover its onside kick and managed to set up a game-winning 55-yard field goal. Fortunately for the Redskins the Cardinals' kick missed wide left—securing the victory.

With the win, the Redskins improved to 4–2.

Week 8: at New England Patriots

Coming off The Redskins' home win over the Cardinals, they traveled to Gillette Stadium for a Week 8 inter-conference duel with the undefeated New England Patriots. In the first quarter, Washington trailed early as New England Patriots quarterback Tom Brady got a 3-yard touchdown run for the only score of the period. In the second quarter, the Redskins continued to fall behind as Brady completed a 2-yard touchdown pass to linebacker Mike Vrabel, kicker Stephen Gostkowski nailed a 36-yard field goal, and Brady pulled a "Marino"—by doing a fake spike and then completing a 6-yard touchdown pass to wide receiver Randy Moss.

In the third quarter, Washington's deficit increased when Brady got a 2-yard touchdown run, along with linebacker Rosevelt Colvin returning a fumble 11 yards for a touchdown. In the fourth quarter, the Patriots finished their job with Brady completing a 2-yard touchdown pass to wide receiver Wes Welker, along with back-up quarterback Matt Cassel getting a 15-yard touchdown run. Afterwards, the Redskins got their only score of the game when quarterback Jason Campbell completed a 15-yard touchdown pass to tight end Chris Cooley.

With the loss, not only did the Redskins fall to 4–3, but the Redskins allowed the most points in a single game since 1961 (53 points to the New York Giants).

Week 9: at New York Jets

Coming off a humiliating road loss to the Patriots, the Redskins traveled to The Meadowlands for a Week 9 inter-conference duel with the New York Jets. In the first quarter, Washington immediately trailed as Jets running back/return specialist Leon Washington returned the opening kickoff 86 yards for a touchdown. The Redskins managed to respond with kicker Shaun Suisham's successful try at a 46-yard field goal, yet the Jets answered with their kicker Mike Nugent getting a 29-yard field goal. In the second quarter, the Jets increased their lead with quarterback Kellen Clemens completing a 1-yard touchdown pass to tight end Joe Kowalewski. The Redskins ended the half with Suisham getting a 40-yard and a 22-yard field goal.

In the third quarter, the Redskins drew closer with Suisham kicking a 40-yard field goal for the only score of the quarter. In the fourth quarter, the Redskins took the lead with running back Clinton Portis getting a 1-yard touchdown run, along with quarterback Jason Campbell's 2-point conversion pass to wide receiver Antwaan Randle El. The Jets managed to force an overtime with Nugent getting a 30-yard field goal. In overtime, the Redskins managed to come out on top as Suisham nailed the game-winning 46-yard field goal.

With the win, the Redskins improved to 5–3. The victory also improved Head Coach Joe Gibbs's overtime record to 10–3.

Week 10: vs. Philadelphia Eagles

Coming off their overtime road win over the Jets, the Redskins went home for an NFC East rematch with the Philadelphia Eagles. In the first quarter, the Redskins trailed early as Eagles quarterback Donovan McNabb completed a 4-yard touchdown pass to running back Brian Westbrook for the only score in the quarter. In the second quarter, the Redskins took the lead when quarterback Jason Campbell hooked up with wide receiver James Thrash on a 4-yard touchdown pass (with a failed PAT) and a 12-yard touchdown pass (with a failed 2-point conversion).

In the third quarter, the Redskins increased their lead with kicker Shaun Suisham getting a 23-yard field goal. Philadelphia managed to draw close with McNabb completing an 8-yard touchdown pass to tight end L.J. Smith (with a failed 2-point conversion). In the fourth quarter, the Redskins padded its lead with Campbell completing a 6-yard touchdown pass to wide receiver Keenan McCardell, yet the Eagles answered with McNabb's 45-yard touchdown pass to wide receiver Reggie Brown. The Redskins tried to pull away as Suisham nailed a 21-yard field goal. However, Philadelphia sealed the win with Westbrook turning a 57-yard reception and a 10-yard run into touchdowns.

With the loss, the Redskins fell to 5–4. This was Sean Taylor's last game that he ever played; he sustained an injury that kept him from playing in the last two games before his death.

Week 11: at Dallas Cowboys

Hoping to rebound from their divisional home loss to the Eagles, the Redskins traveled to Texas Stadium for a Week 11 NFC East showdown with the Dallas Cowboys. In the first quarter, the Redskins struck first when quarterback Jason Campbell completed a 19-yard touchdown pass to tight end Chris Cooley for the only score in the quarter. In the second quarter, the Cowboys tied the game with quarterback Tony Romo completing a 4-yard touchdown pass to wide receiver Terrell Owens. Afterwards, the Redskins took the lead into halftime as kicker Shaun Suisham managed to get a 45-yard field goal.

In the third quarter, the Cowboys took the lead as Romo hooked up with Owens again for a 31-yard touchdown pass. the Redskins' response was Suisham kicking a 39-yard field goal. In the fourth quarter, the Cowboys added onto their lead as Romo and Owens hooked up for a third time on a 46-yard touchdown pass, the Redskins' answer; Suisham kicking a 44-yard field goal. Unfortunately for the Redskins, the Cowboys managed to put the game out of reach with Romo and Owens hooking up for the fourth time on a 52-yard touchdown pass. The Redskins' only response was Campbell's 5-yard touchdown pass to wide receiver Santana Moss.

With the loss, the Redskins fell to 5–5.

Week 12: at Tampa Bay Buccaneers

Trying to snap a two-game losing skid, the Redskins traveled to Raymond James Stadium for a Week 12 battled with the Tampa Bay Buccaneers. In the first quarter, the Redskins trailed early as Buccaneers running back Earnest Graham got a 1-yard touchdown run, along with kicker Matt Bryant getting a 35-yard field goal. In the second quarter, the Redskins continued to struggle as Bryant gave the Buccaneers a 27-yard field goal and a 48-yard field goal. The Redskins got their only score of the half with kicker Shaun Suisham getting a 43-yard field goal.

In the third quarter, the Redskins started to mount a comeback as quarterback Jason Campbell completed a 39-yard touchdown pass to tight end Chris Cooley for the only score of the quarter. In the fourth quarter, the Redskins managed to creep closer as Suisham nailed a 38-yard field goal. However, the Buccaneers' defense held on to secure the win.

With their third-straight loss, the Redskins fell to 5–6.

In the game, the Redskins were plagued with 6 turnovers (2 interceptions and 4 lost fumbles), which was the most the Redskins had ever given up in a single game since playing the Giants in 2004 (the Redskins had given up 7 turnovers in that game).

Chris Cooley had a total of 24 touchdown receptions since 2004 (the most by an NFC tight end).

Death of Sean Taylor

On November 27, 2007, the Redskins lost Sean Taylor to a gunshot wound inflicted the day before. At the time, he was at home resting a knee injury that had kept him off the field for the two games prior to the incident. On November 26, 2007, at 1:45 a.m., Taylor was shot in the upper leg by an armed intruder at his Palmetto Bay home, critically wounding him by severing his femoral artery. His girlfriend tried to call the police from the house line, but experienced difficulty calling. Initial reports suggested that the line had been cut, though Police investigation subsequently refuted that. Taylor's girlfriend proceeded to call 911 from her cell phone, which delayed response time.

Taylor was airlifted to the Ryder Trauma Center at Jackson Memorial Hospital where he underwent surgery. He emerged from surgery about 12:30 P.M. However, he had lost a significant amount of blood and remained unconscious and in a coma. Taylor's doctors speculated that he had suffered brain damage due to the blood loss. An unnamed Redskins source reported that Taylor's heart stopped twice during the emergency surgery. Washington running back Clinton Portis and owner Dan Snyder were at the hospital where Taylor was cared for from the time they heard about the incident until his death. Portis was a junior on the University of Miami's National Championship team in 2001 while Taylor was a freshman.

In the early morning of November 27, 2007, Taylor died at the hospital. The news was released to the media by Richard Sharpstein (lawyer), who learned the news from Taylor's father around 5:30 a.m.

In 2004, when Gibbs made his comeback official, he had chosen Taylor, the fifth player selected in the 2004 NFL Draft, as his first round pick. Taylor, with agent Drew Rosenhaus, signed a seven-year, $18 million contract with the team – a contract which had 4 more years left when he died. Taylor was coming off a Pro Bowl season in 2006, and was the leading vote getter for NFC free safety in 2007 when his untimely death occurred. Taylor was posthumously elected to the starting free safety position for the NFC.

Week 13: vs. Buffalo Bills

Just days after teammate Sean Taylor died of his injuries, the Redskins tried to snap a three-game skid at home against the Buffalo Bills. Before the kickoff, the stadium held a memorial service for Sean Taylor, as well as players across the NFL wearing a #21 sticker on the back of their helmets. For the team's first defensive play, they came out with only 10 players on the field, as their honor to Taylor.

In the first quarter, the Redskins took the early lead as kicker Shaun Suisham managed to get a 27-yard field goal for the only score of the quarter. In the second quarter, the Redskins increased their lead as Suisham kicked a 28-yard field goal. Later, the Bills got on the board as linebacker Angelo Crowell sacked quarterback Jason Campbell in his end zone for a safety. The Redskins ended the half as Suisham kicked a 33-yard field goal.

In the third quarter, the Bills drew closer as kicker Rian Lindell managed to get a 38-yard field goal. Later, the Redskins responded with running back Clinton Portis getting a 3-yard touchdown run. Afterwards, the Bills ended the half as Lindell kicked a 43-yard field goal. In the fourth quarter, the Bills drew closer as Lindell kicked a 24-yarder, along with a 33-yard field goal. Later, the Bills got into position to kick a 51-yard field goal. They got the kick, but Head Coach Joe Gibbs called timeout. When the Bills tried to kick again, Gibbs called timeout again, but unintentionally got his team an unsportsmanlike conduct penalty which not only moved the Bills 15 yards closer to their end zone but reduced Lindell's field goal attempt to 36 yards. Afterwards, the Bills ended the game with Lindell nailing the game-winning 36-yard field goal.

With their fourth-straight loss, Washington fell to 5–7.

Week 14: vs. Chicago Bears

Coming off a home loss to the Bills (along with attending Sean Taylor's funeral in Florida), the Redskins played at home for their Week 13 Thursday night inter-conference game with the Chicago Bears. After a scoreless first quarter, the Redskins scored first when quarterback Todd Collins completed a 21-yard touchdown pass to tight end Todd Yoder for the only score of the second quarter.

In the third quarter, Washington's fullback Mike Sellers scored on a 1-yard touchdown run. The Bears replied with kicker Robbie Gould making a 30-yard field goal, and later quarterback Brian Griese completed a 17-yard touchdown pass to wide receiver Bernard Berrian. In the fourth quarter, the Redskins responded with kicker Shaun Suisham kicking a 23-yard field goal. Later, Chicago made it closer as Gould kicked a 22-yard field goal. Afterwards, the Redskins increased their lead with Collins completing a 16-yard touchdown pass to running back Ladell Betts. The Bears answered with Gould making a 21-yard field goal, but their onside kick failed, which preserved a Washington win.

With the win, the Redskins improved to 6–7.

Starting quarterback Jason Campbell (10/16 for 100 yards) left the game in the second quarter with a dislocated left knee cap.

Week 15: at New York Giants

Coming off their home win over the Chicago Bears, the Redskins traveled to Giants Stadium for a Week 15 Sunday night NFC East rematch with the New York Giants. Quarterback Todd Collins made his first start since 1997.

In the first quarter, the Redskins drew first blood when the kicker Shaun Suisham nailed a 49-yard field goal for the only score of the quarter. In the second quarter, the Redskins increased its lead with Suisham kicking a 31-yard field goal, and to add to it after with running back Ladell Betts getting a 14-yard touchdown run. The Giants got on the board with kicker Lawrence Tynes getting a 35-yard field goal. The Redskins ended the half with Suisham nailing a 28-yard field goal.

In the third quarter, the Redskins continued its dominance with running back Clinton Portis gets a 5-yard touchdown run. The Giants tried to rally as quarterback Eli Manning completed a 19-yard touchdown pass to tight end Kevin Boss. Afterwards, the Redskins' defense (along with the wind) held the Giants in check.

With the win, the Redskins improved to 7–7.

Week 16: at Minnesota Vikings

This game was a must-win for the Redskins in order to maintain their playoff hopes. During the first quarter, the Redskins appeared to be in the position to score after Fred Smoot intercepted Tarvaris Jackson and returned the interception deep into Viking territory. However, the Redskins' offense was unable to score a touchdown. Mike Sellers appeared to score a touchdown on 4th and goal, but a replay challenge by Brad Childress nullified the touchdown and gave the Vikings the ball. However, the Redskins immediately tackled Tony Richardson in the end zone for a safety. Following the subsequent free kick, the Redskins marched down the field and took a 9–0 lead on a 33-yard pass from Todd Collins to Chris Cooley.

In the 2nd quarter, the Redskins expanded their lead to 16–0 on a 32-yard pass from Todd Collins to Santana Moss. Later in the quarter, the Redskins took a 22–0 lead when Clinton Portis took a handoff from Todd Collins and threw a 15-yard touchdown pass to Antwaan Randle El in the end zone. Although the Redskins were not successful on the 2-point conversion attempt, they had a commanding lead at this point in the game, and the previously rowdy Metrodome crowd was very disheartened and silent at this point.

The Redskins stretched their lead to 25–0 on a 26-yard field goal by Shaun Suisham. Later in the quarter, the Vikings got the crowd back in the game when Tarvaris Jackson threw a 2-yard touchdown pass to Jim Kleinsasser, cutting the Redskins' lead to 25–7.

The Vikings further cut into the Redskins' lead around the 10-minute mark of the fourth quarter when Tarvaris Jackson scored on a 6-yard run, making the lead 25–14. The Metrodome crowd began sensing a comeback as momentum appeared to turn in the Vikings' favor. This came to a head midway through the fourth quarter when the Redskins appeared to complete a long pass to Santana Moss. Though initially ruled a catch by a referee on the sideline, the call was considered questionable by the game's announcers since Moss had to drag his toes to stay in-bounds as he caught the pass. Sensing an impending challenge by Childress, the Redskins raced down the field to snap the ball—since a play cannot be challenged after the ball has been snapped for the next play. However, the snap was fumbled and it appeared to be Vikings' ball after it was recovered by Vikings' defensive tackle Kevin Williams.

As the Vikings rushed onto the field to take over on offense, coach Joe Gibbs challenged that Minnesota had twelve defensive players on the field at the time the Redskins snapped the ball and fumbled it. After review, Gibbs' challenge was upheld and the call on the field was reversed—a five-yard penalty was assessed to the Vikings for having too many men on the field and the Redskins maintained possession. After the Redskins had retain possession of the football they had eventually scored on a 13-yard touchdown run by Clinton Portis, making the score 32–14 capping off a 75-yard drive. Although Tarvaris Jackson later scored on a 1-yard touchdown run to make the score 32–21, the Vikings were unable to score again, and the Redskins emerged with a victory. This enabled them to ensure that they will be able to control their own "destiny" to make the playoffs.

Week 17: vs. Dallas Cowboys

Needing a win (or losses by the Vikings & Saints) to secure a playoff berth, the Redskins closed out the regular season at home with an NFC East rematch with the Dallas Cowboys.  In the first quarter, the Redskins got off to a fast start with running back Clinton Portis getting a 23-yard touchdown run for the only score of the quarter.  In the second quarter, the Redskins increased its lead with kicker Shaun Suisham getting a 46-yard field goal.  The Cowboys responded with kicker Nick Folk getting a 37-yard field goal. Afterwards, the Redskins closed out the half with Suisham nailing a 21-yard field goal.

In the third quarter, the Redskins increased its lead with Portis getting a 1-yard touchdown run for the only score of the quarter.  In the fourth quarter, the Redskins closed out their divisional rival with quarterback Todd Collins completing a 42-yard touchdown pass to wide receiver Santana Moss.  The Cowboys finished their game with Folk getting a 30-yard field goal.

With the win, not only did the Redskins close out the regular season at 9–7, but they also clinched the NFC's #6 seed and/or 2nd wild card playoff spot.

Playoffs

Schedule

NFC: Seattle Seahawks 35, Washington Redskins 14

Scoring

First quarter
 SEA – Leonard Weaver 17 yd TD run (Josh Brown kick), 3:45. Seahawks 7–0. Drive: 6 plays, 45 yards, 3:21.
Second quarter
 SEA – Josh Brown 50 yd FG, 8:58. Seahawks 10–0. Drive: 5 plays, 33 yards, 1:42.
Third quarter
 SEA – Josh Brown 33 yd FG, 4:30. Seahawks 13–0. Drive: 8 plays, 52 yards, 4:24.
Fourth quarter
 WAS – Antwaan Randle El 7 yd TD pass from Todd Collins (Shaun Suisham kick), 14:53. Seahawks 13–7. Drive: 12 plays, 84 yards, 4:37.
 WAS – Santana Moss 30 yd TD pass from Todd Collins (Shaun Suisham kick), 12:38. Redskins 14–13. Drive: 3 plays, 42 yards, 1:19.
 SEA – D.J. Hackett 20 yd TD pass from Matt Hasselbeck (Marcus Pollard pass from Matt Hasselbeck), 6:06. Seahawks 21–14. Drive: 5 plays, 42 yards, 1:57.
 SEA – Marcus Trufant 78 yd interception return TD (Josh Brown kick), 5:38. Seahawks 28–14.
 SEA – Jordan Babineaux 57 yd interception return TD (Josh Brown kick), 0:27. Seahawks 35–14.

Injuries
Current as of December 17, 2007:

Statistics
Through Week 16

Passing

Rushing

Receiving

Kicking

Punting

Defense

References

Washington
Washington Redskins seasons
Red